David Colvin may refer to:

 D. Leigh Colvin (1880–1959), American politician
 David Colvin (rower) (born 1965), Australian rowing coxswain and coach